Gela Aprasidze (born 14 January 1998) is a Georgian rugby union player who plays as a scrum-half for Montpellier in the Top 14 and the Georgia national team.
He was a member of the Georgia U20 squad for the 2017 World Rugby Under 20 Championship.

Biography

Arrival in 2017 in Montpellier
Aprasidze signed as a prospect in 2017 at Montpellier Hérault Rugby. He is the 4th in the Scrum half (rugby union) hierarchy behind Ruan Pienaar, Benoît Paillaugue and Enzo Sanga. Taking advantage of their injuries, he made his first start against Exeter in the European Cup.

References

1998 births
Living people
Rugby union players from Georgia (country)
Georgia international rugby union players
Montpellier Hérault Rugby players
Rugby union scrum-halves